Alms are money, food, or other material goods donated to people living in poverty. Providing alms is often considered an act of virtue or charity. The act of providing alms is called almsgiving, and it is a widespread practice in a number of different religions and cultures.

Etymology 

Buddhism

Dāna in Buddhism

In Buddhism, both "almsgiving" and "giving" are called "dāna" (Pāli). Such giving is one of the three elements of the path of practice as formulated by the Buddha for laypeople. This path of practice for laypeople is dāna, sīla, and bhāvanā.

Generosity towards other sentient beings is also emphasized in Mahayana as one of the perfections (paramita). As shown in Lama Tsong Khapa's 'The Abbreviated Points of the Graded Path':

The giving of alms is the beginning of one's journey to Nirvana. In practice, one can give anything with or without thought for Nibbana. This would lead to faith, one key power that one should generate within oneself for the Buddha, Dhamma, and Sangha.

According to the Pali canon:

Intentions for giving 
The intentions behind giving play an important role in developing spiritual qualities. The suttas record various motives for exercising generosity. For example, the Anguttara Nikaya (A.iv, 236) enumerates the following eight motives:

 One gives with annoyance, or as a way of offending the recipient, or with the idea of insulting him.
 Fear also can motivate a person to make an offering.
 One gives in return for a favor done to oneself in the past.
 One also may give with the hope of getting a similar favor for oneself in the future.
 One gives because giving is considered good.
 "I cook, they do not cook. It is not proper for me who cooks not to give to those who do not cook." (i.e. Some give because they are able to do what others cannot.)
 Some give alms to gain a good reputation.
 Still others give alms to adorn and beautify the mind.

In support of Buddhist monks 
In Buddhism, alms or almsgiving is the respect given by a lay Buddhist to a Buddhist monk, nun, spiritually-developed person or other sentient being. It is not charity as presumed by Western interpreters. It is closer to a symbolic connection to the spiritual realm and to show humbleness and respect in the presence of the secular society. The act of almsgiving connects the human to the monk or nun and what he/she represents. As the Buddha has stated:

In Theravada Buddhism, nuns (Pāli: bhikkhunis) and monks (Pāli: bhikkhus) practice Takuhatsu where they collect food. This is often perceived as allowing the laypeople to make merit (Pāli: puñña). Money cannot be accepted by a Theravadan Buddhist monk or nun in place of or in addition to food, as the Patimokkha training rules make it an offense worth forfeiture and confession.

In countries that follow Mahayana Buddhism, the practice of Takuhatsu has mostly died out. In China, Korea, and Japan, local cultures resisted the idea of giving food to 'begging' clerics, and there was no tradition of gaining 'merit' by donating to practitioners. After periods of persecution, monasteries were situated in remote mountain areas; the distance between the monastery and the nearest towns made this practice impossible. In Japan, the practice of a weekly or monthly Takuhatsu replaced the daily round. In the Himalayan countries, the large number of bhikkhus would have made an alms round a heavy burden on families. Competition with other religions for support also made daily practice difficult and even dangerous; the first Buddhist monks in the Silla dynasty of Korea were said to be beaten due to their minority at the time.

Christianity 

In Christianity, the giving of alms is viewed as an act of charity. In the Apostolic age, Christians were taught that giving alms was an expression of love. Such care for the poor was to be understood as love for God, who, in the person of Jesus Christ, sacrificed himself for the salvation of believers.

In nearly all Christian denominations, money is donated to support the church's financial needs and its ministry to the less fortunate. In some churches, the alms are placed near to the altar to symbolize that the offering belongs to God and to represent the unity of the congregation.

In Western Christianity 

The offertory is the traditional moment in the Roman Catholic Mass, Lutheran Divine Service, and Anglican Eucharist, when alms are collected. Baptists and Methodists, among other denominations, collect tithes and offerings (alms) during the offertory in church services. A tithe, the first tenth of one's income, is seen as what is owed to God, while an offering (alms) includes anything contributed beyond that. Some fellowships practice regular giving for special purposes called "love offerings" for the poor, destitute or victims of catastrophic loss such as home fires or medical expenses. Traditionally, deacons and deaconesses are responsible for distributing these gifts among widows, orphans, and others in need. Many Christians support a plethora of charitable organizations, not all of which claim a Christian religious affiliation. Many American educational and medical institutions were founded by Christian fellowships giving alms.

In Eastern Christianity 
In the Eastern Orthodox Church and the Eastern Catholic Churches, the collection of alms and tithes has not been formally united to the offertory in any liturgical action. However, either having a collection plate in the narthex or passing it unobtrusively during the service is not uncommon. In Eastern Orthodox theology, almsgiving is an important part of the spiritual life, and fasting should always be accompanied by increased prayer and almsgiving. Almsgiving in the name of the deceased also frequently accompanies prayer for the dead. Those whose financial circumstances do not permit the giving of monetary alms may give alms in other ways, such as intercessory prayer and acts of mercy such as visiting people in prison, clothing the poor or volunteering in soup kitchens.

In the New Testament 
In addition, private acts of charity are a duty and only considered virtuous only if not done for others to admire:

Jesus places the primary focus on the motives behind the outward and inward giving of alms, which should be love:

Jesus contrasts the giving of the rich and the poor:

Giving should be out of love and not out of duty:

Sharing possessions was practised in the church:

Hinduism

Dāna in Hinduism 

In Hinduism,  is an ancient concept of almsgiving dating to the Vedic period of Hinduism.  has been defined in traditional texts as any action of relinquishing the ownership of what one considered or identified as one's own, and investing the same in a recipient without expecting anything in return. While  is typically given to one person or family, Hinduism also discusses charity or giving aimed at public benefit, which is sometimes called utsarga. This aims at larger projects such as building a rest house, school, investing in drinking water or an irrigation well, planting trees, and building care facilities, among others. The practice of begging for alms is called bhiksha.

The 11th century Persian historian Abū Rayḥān al-Bīrūnī, who visited and lived in India for 16 years beginning in about 1017 CE, mentions the practice of charity and almsgiving among Hindus as he observed during his stay. He wrote, "It is obligatory with them (Hindus) every day to give alms as much as possible."

Almsgiving in Hinduism is considered a noble deed to be done without expectation of any return from those who receive the charity. Some texts reason, referring to the nature of social life, that charity is a form of good karma that affects one's future circumstances and environment, and that good charitable deeds leads to good future life because of the reciprocity principle. Other Hindu texts, such as Vyasa Samhita, state that reciprocity may be innate in human nature and social functions but dāna is a virtue in itself, as doing good lifts the nature of one who gives. The texts do not recommend charity to unworthy recipients or where charity may harm or encourage injury to or by the recipient.  is thus a dharmic act, requires an idealistic-normative approach, and has spiritual and philosophical context. Some medieval era authors state that  is best done with śraddhā (faith), which is defined as being in good will, cheerful, welcoming the recipient of the charity and giving without anasuya (finding faults in the recipient). Kohler states that these scholars of Hinduism suggest that charity is most effective when it is done with delight, a sense of "unquestioning hospitality", where the dāna ignores the short term weaknesses as well as the circumstances of the recipient and takes a long-term view.

Institutional dāna 
Satrams, also called Dharamsala or Chathrams in parts of India, have been one means of almsgiving in Hinduism. Satrams are shelters (rest houses) for travelers and the poor, with many serving water and free food. These were usually established along the roads connecting major Hindu temple sites in south Asia, as well as near major temples. Hindu temples have also served as institutions for almsgiving. The dāna the temples received from Hindus were used to feed people in distress as well as fund public projects such as irrigation and land reclamation.

Forms of dāna 
Forms of almsgiving in Hinduism include:
 go dāna, the donation of a cow
 bhu dāna, the donation of land
 vidya dāna or jñāna dāna, the giving of knowledge and skills
 aushadhā dāna, the giving of care for the sick and diseased
 abhay dāna, the giving of freedom from fear (such as asylum or protection for someone facing imminent injury)
 anna dāna, the giving of food to the poor, needy, and all visitors

Between giving food and giving knowledge, Hindu texts suggest the gift of knowledge is superior.

In the Vedas 

In the Upanishads 
The early Upanishads, those composed before 500 BCE, discuss the virtue of almsgiving. For example, Brihadaranyaka Upanishad states in verse 5.2.3 that three characteristics of a good, developed person are self-restraint (dama), compassion or love for all sentient life (daya), and charity. Chandogya Upanishad, similarly, states in Book III that a virtuous life requires tapas (meditation, asceticism), dāna (charity), arjava (straightforwardness, non-hypocrisy), ahimsa (non-violence, non-injury to all sentient beings) and satyavacana (truthfulness).

In Mahabharata and Puranas 
The Adi Parva of the Hindu Epic Mahabharata states in Chapter 91 that a person must first acquire wealth by honest means, then embark on charity; be hospitable to those who come to him; never inflict pain on any living being; and share a portion with others whatever he consumes. In the Vana Parva, Chapter 194, the Mahabharata recommends that one must "conquer the mean by charity, the untruthful by truth, the wicked by forgiveness, and dishonesty by honesty".

The Bhagavata Purana discusses when  is proper and when it is improper. In Book 8, Chapter 19, verse 36, it states that charity is inappropriate if it endangers and cripples modest livelihood of one's biological dependents or of one's own. Charity from surplus income above that required for modest living is recommended in the Puranas.

Islam 
In Islam, the concept of charitable giving is generally divided into voluntary giving, sadaqah, and an obligatory practice, the zakat. Zakat is governed by a specific set of rules within Islamic jurisprudence and is intended to fulfill a well-defined set of theological and social requirements. Sadaqah is possibly a better translation of Christian influenced formulations of the notion of 'alms' for that reason, though zakat plays a much larger role within Islamic charity.

Zakat 

Zakat is the third of the five pillars of Islam. The literal meaning of the word zakat is "to purify", "to develop" and "cause to grow". Zakat is the amount of money that every Muslim, male or female, who is an adult, mentally stable, free, and financially able, has to pay to support specific categories of people. According to shariah, it is an act of worship. Possessions are purified by setting aside a proportion for those in need. This cutting back, like the pruning of plants, balances and encourages new growth. Various rules are attached but, in general terms, it is obligatory to give 2.5% of one's savings and business revenue and 5–10% of one's harvest to the poor. Possible recipients include the destitute, the working poor, those who are unable to pay off their own debts, stranded travelers and others who need assistance, with the general principle of zakat always being that the rich should pay it to the poor. One of the most important principles of Islam is that all things belong to God and wealth is therefore held by human beings in trust.

This category of people is defined in At-Tawbah:

The obligatory nature of zakat is firmly established in the Qur'an, the sunnah (or hadith), and the consensus of the companions and the Muslim scholars. Allah states in At-Tawbah:

Muslims of each era have agreed upon the obligatory nature of paying zakat from their gold and silver, and from other kinds of currency.

Nisab 

Zakat is obligatory when a certain amount of money, called the nisab (or minimum amount), is reached or exceeded. Zakat is not obligatory if the amount owned is less than this nisab. The nisab of gold and golden currency is 20 mithqal, or approximately 85 grams of pure gold. One mithqal is approximately 4.25 grams. The nisab of silver and silver currency is 200 dirhams, which is approximately 595 grams of pure silver. The nisab of other kinds of money and currency is to be scaled to that of gold; the nisab of money is equivalent to the price of 85 grams of 999-type (pure) gold on the day in which zakat is paid.

Zakat is obligatory after the money has been in the control of its owner for the span of one lunar year; a lunar year is approximately 355 days. The owner then needs to pay 2.5% (or 1/40) of the money as zakat. The owner should deduct any amount of money he or she borrowed from others, check if the rest reaches the necessary nisab, then pay zakat for it.

If the owner had enough money to satisfy the nisab at the beginning of the year, but his wealth in any form increased, the owner needs to add the increase to the nisab amount owned at the beginning of the year and then pay zakat, 2.5%, of the total at the end of the lunar year. There are minor differences between fiqh schools on how this is to be calculated. Each Muslim calculates his or her own zakat individually. For most purposes, this involves the payment each year of two and a half percent of one's capital.

Sadaqah 

A pious person may also give alms as much as he or she pleases as sadaqah, and does so preferably in secret. Although this word can be translated as 'voluntary charity', it has a wider meaning, as illustrated in the hadiths:

Judaism

Tzedakah 

In Judaism, tzedakah, a Hebrew term literally meaning righteousness but commonly used to signify "charity", refers to the religious obligation to do what is right and just.

In Judaism, tzedakah is seen as one of the greatest deeds that a person can do. Tzedakah, along with prayer and repentance, is regarded as ameliorating the consequences of bad acts. Contemporary tzedakah is regarded as a continuation of the Biblical Maaser Ani, or poor-tithe, as well as Biblical practices including permitting the poor to glean the corners of a field, harvest during the Shmita (sabbatical year), and other practices. Jewish farmers are commanded to leave the corners of their fields for the starving to harvest for food and are forbidden to pick up any grain that has been dropped during harvesting, as such food shall be left for the starving as well.

In the Mishneh Torah, Chapter 10:7–14, Maimonides lists eight "laws about giving to poor people", listed in order from most to least righteous, with the most righteous form being allowing an individual to become self-sustaining and capable of giving others charity:
 Enabling the recipient to become self-reliant.
 Giving when neither party knows the other's identity.
 Giving when you know the recipient's identity, but the recipient doesn't know your identity.
 Giving when you do not know the recipient's identity, but the recipient knows your identity.
 Giving before being asked.
 Giving after being asked.
 Giving less than you should, but giving it cheerfully.
 Giving begrudgingly.

Mandaeism

Zidqa

In Mandaeism, zidqa refers to alms or almsgiving. Mandaean priests receive regular financial contributions from laypeople.

The Mandaic term zidqa brika (literally "blessed oblation") refers to a ritual meal blessed by priests. An early self-appellation for Mandaeans is bhiri zidqa, meaning "elect of righteousness".

See also

Notes

References

Bibliography 

 Mydans, Seth (20 September 2007). Monks Pressure Myanmar Junta (New York Times). Retrieved 20 September 2007 from "The New York Times
 Nyanatiloka Mahathera (4th ed., 1980). Buddhist Dictionary: Manual of Buddhist Terms and Doctrines. Kandy, Sri Lanka: Buddhist Publication Society. . Available on-line at Budsas.org
 Pāli Text Society (PTS) (1921–1925). The Pāli Text Society's Pāli-English dictionary. London: Chipstead. Available on-line at Uchicago.edu 
 Thanissaro Bhikkhu (trans.) (1997). Tanhavagga: Craving (Dhp XXIV). Available on-line at Accesstoinsight.org
 Thanissaro Bhikkhu (trans.) (2001). The Group of Fours (Itivuttaka 4). Available on-line at  Accesstoinsight.org
 Tsongkhapa & Alexander Berzin (trans.) (2001). The Abbreviated Points of the Graded Path. Available on-line at StudyBuddhism.com